A total solar eclipse occurred on October 1, 1940. A solar eclipse occurs when the Moon passes between Earth and the Sun, thereby totally or partly obscuring the image of the Sun for a viewer on Earth. A total solar eclipse occurs when the Moon's apparent diameter is larger than the Sun's, blocking all direct sunlight, turning day into darkness. Totality occurs in a narrow path across Earth's surface, with the partial solar eclipse visible over a surrounding region thousands of kilometres wide. Totality was visible from Colombia, Brazil, Venezuela and South Africa.

Related eclipses

Solar eclipses 1939–1942

Saros 133

Metonic series

Notes

References 

1940 10 01
1940 10 01
1940 in science
October 1940 events